Junjarwad also written as Zunjarwad is a village in Belgaum district in the southern state of Karnataka, India. This is located at a distance of 33km from taluk headquarter Athani. Major occupation of the habitats is agriculture and village has around 3000 acres of agriculture land . Sugar cane is the primary crop. Majority of the villagers belongs to digambarJain religion .Other religions like lingayat, Islam and others are also practiced by villagers

References

Villages in Belagavi district